Nicola Kuhn (born 20 March 2000) is an Austrian-born German tennis player. He has a career high ATP singles ranking of World No. 174, achieved on 7 October 2019 and a doubles ranking of World No. 287 achieved on 28 January 2019.

Personal life
Kuhn has a German father and a Russian mother.

From April 2016 to October 2021, he represented Spain.

Junior career

Kuhn won the 2017 French Open – Boys' doubles title and reached the singles final of the same tournament.

Professional career

2017: ATP debut
Kuhn won his first ATP Challenger Tour title as a qualifier at the Sparkassen Open in Braunschweig.

He made his ATP main draw debut at the Shenzhen Open as a wildcard.

2018: Maiden ATP win
Kuhn got to the finals of the Budapest Indoor Challenger Open in February 2018, but lost to ATP Tour veteran Vasek Pospisil in three sets. But he teamed up with Felix Auger-Aliassime to win the same tournament's doubles title. Next month Kuhn was awarded a wildcard for the 2018 Miami Open. He defeated Darian King to win his maiden ATP main draw match. He became the youngest Spaniard since Rafael Nadal to win a match on the ATP World Tour. In the second round he lost in straight sets to 15th seed Fabio Fognini.

2022: Grand Slam debut
He qualified for the 2022 Wimbledon Championships making his Grand Slam debut.

Singles performance timeline 

Current through the 2022 Hamburg European Open.

ATP Challenger and ITF Futures finals

Singles: 5 (3–2)

Doubles: 1 (1–0)

Junior Grand Slam finals

Singles: 1 (1 runner-up)

Doubles: 1 (1 title)

References

External links
 
 

2000 births
Living people
Spanish male tennis players
German male tennis players
Sportspeople from Innsbruck
German expatriate sportspeople in Spain
Spanish people of German descent
Spanish people of Russian descent
German people of Russian descent
French Open junior champions
Grand Slam (tennis) champions in boys' doubles